Under the Skin, known in Japan as  is an action-adventure video game by Capcom. It was developed by the company's Production Studio 4, and released in 2004 for the PlayStation 2. Containing science fiction and comedy elements, the main character of the game's story is an extraterrestrial named Cosmi, sent from Planet Mischief to Earth to generally wreak havoc. The game features cameos from some of the cast of one of Capcom's other games, such as an entire level that functions as a parody of Resident Evil 3: Nemesis.

Plot
The story revolves around the Planet Mischief, where there is a tradition that once someone turns 3-years old, he or she must travel to a planet and learn how to perform "Mischief" and cause panic on that planet. Cosmi, a three-year-old alien, travels to Earth for his mission, in order to impress his father, the Master of Mischief, Cosmi Sr., mostly because Earth is considered the greatest challenge. Cosmi crashes with a TV satellite from a town called Coco Town. When crash landing, he manages to hide in an alley on Coco Town, where he is saved by Earth's Mischief Master, Master Itazura. He takes him to his Dojo to train, and lets Cosmi move on with his mission, on 8 different locations: Coco Town, High Stakes Hill, Pranksylvania, Pharaoh Island, Big Booty Bay, Frontiersville, Raccoon City and finally Cosmopolis. It is revealed that Cosmopolis is a trap for "Anti-Alien-Forces" to capture all of the aliens on Earth by disguising themselves as aliens. Itazura uses their trap as the final challenge for Cosmi, and challenges him personally there. Cosmi wins and travels back to Planet Mischief to celebrate, but crashes into another TV-station and crashlands on Earth again, this time, in the middle of Coco Town square. Of course, panic arises and reporters try to get a snapshot of the little alien, but Cosmi accidentally pushes someones camera around, causing it to take a photo of the crowd, thus revealing that several of them are also aliens.

Gameplay
Since Cosmi is vulnerable in his small alien form, he must first beam up a nearby earthling in order to create a disguise for himself. Once he has beamed a person up, he can change his form by stepping under a UFO. Each earthling has a different ability that can be used for causing mischief, such as boomboxes, vacuum cleaners or bazookas. Successfully knocking over earthlings yields coins that are required to complete the goals set in each level. Once pranked, the earthlings will become hostile towards Cosmi and try to attack him. While disguised, Cosmi can take two hits, the first leaving him in underwear (a possible homage to Ghosts 'n Goblins), while the second one reverts him to his vulnerable alien form. Earthlings will continue to chase and attack Cosmi, forcing him to lose coins, until he can find another UFO to change into another disguise. At certain points in the level, a Panic Time will occur where something crazy in the stage happens for a short amount of time.

Reception

The game received "mixed" reviews according to the review aggregation website Metacritic.

Notes

References

External links
 

2004 video games
Action-adventure games
Alien invasions in video games
Capcom games
Science fiction comedy
Multiplayer and single-player video games
Parody video games
PlayStation 2 games
PlayStation 2-only games
Science fiction video games
Video games about extraterrestrial life
Video games developed in Japan
Video games set on fictional planets
Video games with cel-shaded animation